Spiros Kastanas (born December 12, 1962) is a former international Cypriot football defender.

He started his career in 1987 from Ethnikos Achna. In 1989, he moved to Anorthosis Famagusta where he totally played for seven years. In 1996, he returned to Ethnikos Achna where he ended his career in 2000.

External links
 

1962 births
Living people
People from Famagusta
Ethnikos Achna FC players
Anorthosis Famagusta F.C. players
Cypriot footballers
Cyprus international footballers
Greek Cypriot people
Association football defenders
Cypriot football managers